

The Brunswick-Balke-Collender OQ-4 was a prototype drone built in the United States by the Brunswick-Balke-Collender corporation.

The OQ-4 was one of a very few aviation-related ventures undertaken by Brunswick-Balke-Collender, which was basically a non-aviation company. It was similar in some respects to the Radioplane OQ-2, including a 12-foot wingspan. Although a few prototypes were built, the OQ-4 was not put into production, perhaps because Radioplane and Frankfort could produce enough target drone so that another production line was not necessary.

Specifications

See also

References

External links

1940s United States special-purpose aircraft
Unmanned aerial vehicles of the United States